Labrys methylaminiphilus is a Gram-negative and non-motile bacteria from the family Xanthobacteraceae which has been isolated from sediments of a lake in Seattle, Washington, United States.

References

Further reading

External links
Type strain of Labrys methylaminiphilus at BacDive -  the Bacterial Diversity Metadatabase

Hyphomicrobiales
Bacteria described in 2005